Carter Jones Skate Park, also known as Fonticello Skate Park, is a skatepark located within Carter Jones Park in Richmond, Virginia, United States.  Opened on July 28, 2013, officially as Fonticello Skate Park, Carter Jones Skate Park is the city’s first public skatepark and is maintained by the Richmond Department of Parks, Recreation, and Community Facilities.

Elements
Carter Jones Skate Park features three quarter pipes, a back-to-back ramp with rail, a single-ended ramp, an elevated flat with curvature, two banks, and a stair box, all with steel coping, and a fixed rail. In addition movable rails and construction barriers are usually found on site.

See also
Skateparks in Virginia
Ashland Skate Park
 Texas Beach Skate Park

References

External links
 

Skateparks in the United States
Parks in Richmond, Virginia